Amy Louise Bagshaw (10 October 1988) is an international gymnast from Shropshire, Great Britain. She competed for the Great Britain team five times, the England team two times and was British National Champion at the age of 11. She  went on to compete for Great Britain in Canada but had to retire from gymnastics in September 2005 due to an injury. A member of the 2004 Olympic training squad.

Amy trained at Park Wrekin College Gymnastics Club based in Telford, Shropshire. She was a gymnast for 12 years and was on her way to compete for a spot at the Olympics. She has written an unpublished autobiography and classes meeting Kylie Minogue and Tony Blair as amongst her achievements,

References

External links
Amy Bagshaw on Kid Kountry Site
Park Wrekin College Gymnastics Club
Amy Bagshaw and her book

1988 births
Living people
British female artistic gymnasts